Un jardin sur l'Oronte ("A Garden on the Orontes") is an opera ("lyric drama") in four acts and eight tableaux by Alfred Bachelet to a French libretto adapted by Franc-Nohain from a novel of the same name by Maurice Barrès. The premiere took place on 7 November 1932 at the Palais Garnier in Paris, France.

Performance history
Un jardin sur l'Oronte was premiered at the Palais Garnier in Paris on 7 November 1932 with Suzanne Balguerie in the title role.

Roles

References

Sources

Further reading
 
 
 

French-language operas
Operas
1932 operas
Operas based on novels
Opera world premieres at the Paris Opera
Maurice Barrès